Juan Manuel Bordaberry (born February 18, 1985 in Laprida (Buenos Aires), Argentina) is an Argentine former professional footballer who played as a defender.

References
 
 

1985 births
Living people
Sportspeople from Buenos Aires Province
Argentine footballers
Association football defenders
Racing Club de Avellaneda footballers
Estudiantes de Buenos Aires footballers
Defensores de Belgrano footballers
Deportes Concepción (Chile) footballers
Primera B de Chile players
Argentine Primera División players
Argentine expatriate footballers
Argentine expatriate sportspeople in Chile
Expatriate footballers in Chile
Argentine expatriate sportspeople in Bolivia
Expatriate footballers in Bolivia